William Trubridge  (born 24 May 1980) is a New Zealand world champion and world record holding freediver.

Trubridge was the first diver to go deeper than  without oxygen and as of 2013 held the world record in the free immersion and constant weight without fins disciplines.

Life
Trubridge was born in Northumberland in northern England, but moved with his family to New Zealand when he was eighteen months old.

As a diver, Trubridge mainly competes in depth disciplines. He has scored the highest number of points for an individual at the Team's World Championships, 313.3, which he achieved at the 2010 Freediving Team's World Championships held in Okinawa, Japan.

On 18 January 2011, Trubridge won the World's Absolute Freediver Award (WAFA), as the best all around freediver, with the highest combined score in six freediving disciplines: static apnea, dynamic apnea with fins, dynamic apnea without fins (pool disciplines), constant weight apnea with fins, constant weight without fins, and free immersion (depth disciplines).

Trubridge is an Apnea Academy instructor and  operated a freediving school and annual competition, both called Vertical Blue, at Dean's Blue Hole in Long Island, Bahamas from September to May. During the summer he teaches courses in Europe and has trained at the Tenerife Top Training Center. 

Trubridge was the main subject of a documentary entitled "Breathe" directed by Martin Khodabakhshian, which documents Trubridge's pursuits in 2010 to become the first free diver ever to reach 300 feet with a single breath in the discipline of constant weight no fins.

On 15 February 2019 Trubridge became the first man to complete an 'underwater crossing' of one of the major channels, swimming across the Cook Strait as a series of 934 breath hold dives.  He wore fins and swam with a dolphin kick horizontally underwater at a depth between 3–5 meters, surfacing only for short recoveries during which he remained immobile.  The crossing took 9 hours 15 minutes and was done to raise awareness of the plight of New Zealand's Hector's and Māui dolphins, which are both threatened with extinction due predominantly to over-fishing in their ranges.

In the 2021 New Year Honours, Trubridge was appointed a Member of the New Zealand Order of Merit, for services to free diving.

World records

 81 m (265.74 ft) Constant Weight without fins, 9 April 2007
 82 m (269.02 ft) Constant Weight without fins, 11 April 2007
 84 m (275.59 ft) Constant Weight without fins, 4 April 2008
 107 m (351.04 ft) Free Immersion, 8 April 2008
 86 m (282.15 ft) Constant Weight without fins, 10 April 2008
 108 m (354.33 ft) Free Immersion, 11 April 2008
 88 m (288.71 ft) Constant Weight without fins, 10 April 2009
 90 m (295.27 ft) Constant Weight without fins, 3 December 2009
 92 m (301.83 ft) Constant Weight without fins, 19 April 2010
 116 m (380.57 ft) Free Immersion, 22 April 2010
 95 m (311.67 ft) Constant Weight without fins, 26 April 2010
 96 m (314.96 ft) Constant Weight without fins, 10 December 2010
 100 m (328.08 ft) Constant Weight without fins, 14 December 2010
 101 m (331.36 ft) Constant Weight without fins, 16 December 2010
 121 m (396.98 ft) Free Immersion, 10 April 2011
 122 m (~400 ft) Free Immersion, 30 April 2016
 124 m (~407 ft) Free Immersion, 2 May 2016
 102 m (334.65 ft) Constant Weight without fins, 21 July 2016

Personal bests

References

External links
 official website of William Trubridge
 Vertical Blue Freediving homepage
 Current Freediving World Records
 Deeperblue.net Free-diving forum
 Apnea Academy - A global teaching organisation for underwater apnea - presided over by Umberto Pelizzari
 Freediving New Zealand website
 Short documentary about William Trubridge by Nicolas Rossier
 William Trubridge freediving and zen journey
 DiveWise.Org - non-profit organization dedicated to freediver education, science and safety

1980 births
Living people
New Zealand freedivers
English emigrants to New Zealand
Sportspeople from Northumberland
Members of the New Zealand Order of Merit